Fly The Flags is a live album by the band Stiff Little Fingers, first released on 26 October 1994 (see 1994 in music), and re-released (by Snapper) in 1998 (see 1998 in music).

Track listing
"Long Way to Paradise"  (Burns)   – 4:20 
"Roots, Radicals, Rockers and Reggae"  (Stiff Little Fingers)   – 3:30 
"Nobody's Hero"  (Burns, Ogilvie)   – 5:05 
"No Surrender"  (Burns)   – 4:07 
"Gotta Gettaway"  (Ogilvie, Stiff Little Fingers)   – 4:08 
"Just Fade Away"  (Ogilvie, Stiff Little Fingers)   – 3:12 
"The Cosh"  (Burns)   – 3:40 
"Johnny 7"  (Cluney)   – 4:02 
"Barbed Wire Love"  (Ogilvie, Stiff Little Fingers)   – 4:16  
"Stand up and Shout"  (Burns, Taylor)   – 3:23 
"Johnny Was"  (Bob Marley)   – 8:13 
"Wasted Life"  (Burns)   – 3:24 
"Beirut Moon"  (Burns)   – 4:23 
"Fly the Flag"  (Ogilvie, Stiff Little Fingers)   – 4:14 
"Suspect Device"  (Ogilvie, Stiff Little Fingers)   – 4:44   
"Doesn't Make It All Right"  (Dave Goldberg, Jerry Dammers)   – 6:48 
"Each Dollar a Bullet"  (Burns)   – 3:24 
"Alternative Ulster"  (Stiff Little Fingers)   – 3:22

Personnel
Stiff Little Fingers
Jake Burns – vocals guitar
Dolphin Taylor – drums
Henry Cluney – guitar
Bruce Foxton – bass

1991 live albums
Stiff Little Fingers live albums
Albums recorded at the Brixton Academy